Susan Michaela Sullivan (born November 18, 1942) is an American actress. Sullivan is best known for her roles as Lenore Curtin Delaney on the NBC daytime soap opera Another World (1971–76), as Lois Adams on the ABC sitcom It's a Living (1980–81), as Maggie Gioberti Channing on the CBS primetime soap opera Falcon Crest (1981–90), as Kitty Montgomery on the ABC sitcom Dharma & Greg (1997–2002), and as Martha Rodgers on Castle (2009–2016). She earned an Emmy nomination for Lead Actress for the role of Julie Farr in the 1978 series Julie Farr, M.D. and a Golden Globe nomination for Supporting Actress for her role in Dharma & Greg.

Life and career
Sullivan was born in New York City, the daughter of Helen (née Rockett) and Brendan Sullivan, an advertising executive. She was raised on Long Island in Freeport, Nassau County, where she graduated from Freeport High School in 1960. She earned a BA in drama from Hofstra University in 1964.

She got her start in acting in the 1960s playing opposite Dustin Hoffman in the Broadway play Jimmy Shine. She landed a contract with Universal Studios in 1969, guest-starring on several series. It was during this time that she played roles in daytime dramas.

Starting with a role on A World Apart in 1970, she moved to a five-year stint as Lenore Moore Curtin Delaney on the daytime soap opera Another World. Taking over from Judith Barcroft, Sullivan played the role from 1971 to 1976. She played Charlton Heston's girlfriend Ann, a new character written into the television version of the film Midway (1976). She then played Dr. Elaina Marks opposite Bill Bixby in the Incredible Hulk pilot in 1977, and portrayed Poker Alice opposite James Garner as Bret Maverick on The New Maverick the following year. Sullivan also appeared in Barnaby Jones; episode titled “Final Judgement”(01/26/1978).

She played the role of Maggie Porter in the television drama Rich Man, Poor Man Book II. She played Dr. Julie Farr in Having Babies from 1978 to 1979, and was nominated for a Primetime Emmy Award for Outstanding Lead Actress in a Drama Series, which was made into two television films and later a short-lived weekly series in 1978. During a week in December 1976, she was a panelist on Match Game, both on CBS and in syndication. In 1980, she appeared on the sitcom It's a Living, playing head waitress Lois Adams.

In 1981, Sullivan won the role of Maggie Gioberti in the CBS primetime soap drama Falcon Crest, replacing Samantha Eggar, who had appeared in the pilot. The series became a hit and Maggie became Sullivan's most prominent role to date. She appeared on the series from 1981 to 1989, during which time she was nominated for three Soap Opera Digest awards. At the time Sullivan decided to leave the series in 1989, she had appeared in every episode of the series up to that date (207 of the 227 episodes produced). Sullivan appeared in the first episode of season nine, when her character drowned.

Following Falcon Crest, Sullivan appeared on The George Carlin Show, co-starred on the short-lived political drama The Monroes in the mid-1990s, and played a supporting role in the film My Best Friend's Wedding (as the mother of Cameron Diaz's character) (1997). On Dharma & Greg, she played the snooty country-club matriarch Kitty Montgomery from 1997 to 2002. The series reunited Sullivan with actor Mitchell Ryan (who played her husband Edward), with whom she had worked on Having Babies. She appeared in four episodes in season three of Hope and Faith as Nancy Lombard, Faith's therapist. Sullivan voiced Queen Hippolyta on the animated series Justice League Unlimited. She has also appeared on the television series Brothers & Sisters, Joan of Arcadia, Two and a Half Men, Dead Like Me, The Kominsky Method, and Last Man Standing.

From 2009 to 2016, she co-starred alongside Nathan Fillion, Stana Katic and Molly Quinn on Castle. Her character Martha Rodgers' acting career has somewhat paralleled her own, including references to appearances on soap operas. A clip of Sullivan's appearance in the pilot for The Incredible Hulk has been shown onscreen, purported to be Rodgers' appearance on the series. (Castle Season 2 Episode 16: "Tick, Tick, Tick.")

In the 1980s, a fellow actor on Falcon Crest introduced Sullivan to psychologist Connell Cowan; the couple has been together ever since.

Filmography

References

External links

 
 
 

1942 births
Living people
American soap opera actresses
American film actresses
American stage actresses
American television actresses
Actresses from New York City
People from Freeport, New York
Hofstra University alumni
20th-century American actresses
21st-century American actresses